Golden boot compensation, also known as the Golden Boot, is an inducement, using maximum incentives and financial benefits, for an older worker to take "voluntary" early retirement.

See also
Compromise agreement
Golden handcuffs
Golden parachute
Layoff
Restructuring
Severance package
Voluntary Redundancy

External links
  - Golden Boot Investopedia

Business terms
Employment compensation